Yi Syllables is a Unicode block containing the characters of the Liangshan Standard Yi script for writing the Nuosu, or Yi, language.

Syllables

Note that the name for U+A015 is a misnomer, as the character is actually a syllable iteration mark corresponding to "w" in Yi romanization.

Block

History
The following Unicode-related documents record the purpose and process of defining specific characters in the Yi Syllables block:

Notes

References 

 Unicode chart Yi syllables (pdf) 5.0MB

Unicode blocks